Hot-wiring is the process of bypassing a motor vehicle's ignition switch and thus starting it without the key. It is often utilized during a vehicle theft. However, a legitimate vehicle owner who has lost a vehicle key or starting a vehicle with inoperable ignition switch (e.g. in run-down old cars) may also implement this process.

Methods
Hot-wiring generally involves connecting the wires which complete the circuit when the key is the "on" or "ready" position (turning on the fuel pump, ignition system and other necessary components), then touching another wire that connects to the starter. The specific method of hot-wiring a vehicle is dependent on the particular vehicle's electrical ignition system. Remote start units access the same wires as conventional ignition methods. Listings of wire colors and locations and ignition system schematics may sometimes be found in Internet databases.

Vehicles from the 1990s or older, which often have a carbureted engine, a manual transmission, and a single ignition coil and distributor, can be hot-wired from the engine bay. Using standard lock picking to start a vehicle is now usually ineffective, since most cars now use immobilisers or transponder key verification. Conversely, most types of motorcycles are often easier to hot-wire, especially scooters and older naked bikes, which lack advanced security features beyond mechanical locks and conventional ignition switch.

Thieves lacking the basic mechanical skills and knowledge of automotive electrical systems sometimes simply use physical force to bypass the ignition lock, smashing the key mechanism to reveal the rotation switch, which is operated by the key's tumbler.

See also
Immobiliser

References

Motor vehicle theft
Ignition systems